William Ntori Dankyi (born 4 September 1999) is a Ghanaian professional footballer who plays as a defender for Ghanaian Premier league side Accra Hearts of Oak. He previously played for Liberty Professionals. Dankyi has capped for Ghana at U-17, U-20 and the U-23 national team levels.

Club career

Early career 
Dankyi started his career with lower-tier side Charity Stars before moving to Liberty Professionals. His performance in the Ghana U-17 attracted top-tier teams in Ghana.

Liberty Professionals 
In 2015, Dankyi moved to Dansoman-based side Liberty Professionals, who are known for producing young talented footballers. He became a key member of the senior side in 2017. He made his Ghana Premier League debut during the 2017 Ghanaian Premier League season. He featured in 26 league matches. He played 12 league matches during the first round of the 2018 Ghana Premier League season for Liberty Professionals before being poached by Accra Hearts of Oak during the transfer period.

Hearts of Oak 
In May 2018, Dankyi was signed by Accra Hearts of Oak during the second transfer period during the 2018 Ghana Premier League season. He signed a 3-year contract and was expected to serve as the direct replacement for Joshua Otoo whose contract was mutually terminated few weeks before his signing. He made his debut on 24 May 2018 in a 0–0 against West African Football Academy. He played the full 90 minutes of the match and helped them keep a clean sheet. He played in 3 league matches before the league was abandoned due to the dissolution of the GFA in June 2018, as a result of the Anas Number 12 Expose. During the 2019 GFA Normalization Committee Special Competition, he became a key member of the club under Kim Grant and played an integral role in the club as he featured in all 14 group matches helping Hearts to 1st place in group B.

His league appearances were limited during the 2019–20 Ghana Premier League due competition from Raddy Ovouka. He only featured in 3 league matches before the league was abandoned and later cancelled due to the COVID-19 pandemic. At the end of the season there were reports that he wanted to leave the team due to the lack of play time and limited number of appearances. Dankyi however did not leave the club and was named on the club's squad list for the 2020–21 Ghana Premier League season. At the end of the season, Hearts won the domestic double by winning the league and the 2021 Ghanaian FA Cup after scoring Ashanti Gold in the final via penalty shootout.

International career 
Dankyi has featured for Ghana at U-17, U-20 and U-23 levels, but he is yet to get a call up into the a senior national team.

Youth 
Dankyi played for the Ghana national under-17 football team from 2012 to 2014. In 2013, he was a member of the squad that played in the 2013 African U-17 Championship. In 2018, Isaac Kwadwo Boateng, popularly known as Coach Opeele a former assistant coach of the U-17 revealed that Dankyi had to miss one of his Senior High School education examination papers due to national team commitment. He was personally scouted by him whilst playing for a colts team at Mamprobi Indafa Park.

He was later promoted to the Ghana national under-20 football team featuring for 2016 to 2018. He was given his first call up in 2016, ahead of the 2017 Africa U-20 Cup of Nations qualifiers. In 2018, he was a member of the squad that played in the 2019 Africa U-23 Cup of Nations qualifiers, Ghana subsequently qualified for the main competition after scoring Algeria. In November 2019, he was selected to be part of the Ghana national under-23 football team ahead of the 2019 Africa U-23 Cup of Nations in Egypt.

Honours 
Hearts of Oak

 Ghana Premier League: 2020–21
Ghanaian FA Cup: 2021

References

External links 

 

Living people
1999 births
Association football defenders
Ghanaian footballers
Liberty Professionals F.C. players
Ghana Premier League players
Accra Hearts of Oak S.C. players
Ghana youth international footballers
Ghana under-20 international footballers
Charity Stars F.C. players